Sergey Trishin (born Moscow, 12 December 1984) is a Russian rugby union player. He plays as a centre.

He played for VVA Saracens and currently plays for Enisei-STM, in the Rugby Premier League.

He has 56 caps for Russia, since 2005, with 5 tries scored, 25 points on aggregate. He had his debut at the 52-12 win over the Czech Republic, at 12 November 2005, in Krasnodar, for the Six Nations B. He was called for the 2011 Rugby World Cup, playing in a single game and without scoring. He had his final cap at the 32-27 loss to Japan, at 24 November 2018, in Gloucester, England, in a friendly game.

References

External links
Sergey Trishin International Statistics

1984 births
Living people
Russian rugby union players
Russia international rugby union players
Rugby union centres
VVA Podmoskovye players
Sportspeople from Moscow